Robin Beanland is a British composer of video game music, composing music for numerous Rare titles, such as the Killer Instinct franchise, Conker's Bad Fur Day (which he also co-wrote the screenplay with Chris Seavor), and many others. Prior to joining Rare, Beanland composed music for TV and films. The only current game that he continues to produce music for is Sea of Thieves.

Video game music credits

Awards

See also
 DK Jamz

References

External links
Robin Beanland on MySpace

Profile at MobyGames

Artist profile at OverClocked ReMix
Gamezone interview on scoring the music for Banjo-Kazooie Nuts & Bolts

Year of birth unknown
British composers
British male composers
Living people
Rare (company) people
Video game composers
Year of birth missing (living people)